Olga is an East Slavic female given name, derived from the Old Norse name Helga. It is used in Russia (Ольга), Ukraine (Ольга, transliterated Olha), Belarus (Вольга, transliterated Vol'ha), Bulgaria (Олга transliterated Ólga), the Czech Republic, Greece and Cyprus (Όλγα, Ólgha), Georgia (ოლგა (Olga) or more archaic ოლღა (Olgha)), Latvia, Lithuania (Alge,Algis), Finland, Poland, Hungary, Romania, the Balkans (Serbian Олга or Оља), Western Europe and Latin America (Olga).

Name days (St. Olga of Kiev): Bulgaria, Poland, Czech Republic, Greece and France – July 11, Slovakia – July 23, Ukraine, Russia – July 24, Hungary – July 27.

The male equivalent is Oleg (Олeг).

People

Kievan Rus'
 Saint Olga of Kiev (890–969), regent of Kievan Rus' and wife of Igor of Kiev

Russian imperial family 

 Olga Nikolaevna of Russia (1822–1892), second daughter of Nicholas I of Russia, wife to Charles I, King of Württemberg
 Grand Duchess Olga Feodorovna of Russia (1839–1891), wife of Grand Duke Michael Nikolaevich of Russia
 Grand Duchess Olga Constantinovna of Russia (1851–1926), Queen consort to George I, King of Greece; reigned as Queen regent of Greece in 1920
 Grand Duchess Olga Alexandrovna of Russia (1882–1960), sister of Nicholas II of Russia
 Grand Duchess Olga Nikolaevna of Russia (1895–1918), the eldest daughter of Nicholas II of Russia

Other royalty and nobility 

 Princess Olga of Greece and Denmark (1903–1997), granddaughter of King George I of Greece and wife of Prince Paul of Yugoslavia
 Princess Olga, Duchess of Apulia (born 1971), Princess of Greece and great-grandchild of Olga, Queen of Greece
 Baroness Olga Vadimovna von Root (1901 – unknown), Russian noblewoman, singer, and stage actress
 Olga Ilyinichna Ulyanova (1871–1891), Russian noblewoman and sister of Vladimir Lenin

Other people 

 Olga Ahtinen (born 1997), Finnish footballer
 Olga Aikala (1883–1962), Finnish horologist
 Olga Appell (born 1963), Mexican-American long-distance runner
 Olga Barabanschikova (born 1979), Belarusian tennis player
 Olga Bell (born Olga Balashova 1983), American musician
 Olga Benário Prestes (1908–1942), German-Brazilian communist militant
 Olga Björkegren (1857–1950), Swedish opera singer
 Olga Bodnar (born 1965), Ukrainian politician
 Olga Bogdanova (born 1994), Estonian rhythmic gymnast
 Olga Boznańska (1865–1940), Polish painter
 Olga Bucătaru (1942–2020), Romanian actress
 Olga Bulbenkova (1835–1918), Russian fashion designer
 Olga Dahl (1917–2009), Swedish genealogist
 Olga Danilov (born 1973), Israeli Olympic speed skater
 Olga Danilović (born 2001), Serbian professional tennis player
 Olga Desmond (1891–1964), German actress and dancer
 Olga ('Olly') Donner (1881–1956), Finnish writer
 Olga Dor-Dogadko (born 1976), Israeli track and field athlete
 Olga Dvirna (born 1953), Soviet middle distance runner
 Olga Fedori (born 1984), Ukrainian actress
 Olga Fonda (born 1982), Russian actress and model
 Olga Fricker (1902–1997), Canadian-born dancer, educator and choreographer
 Olga Fridman (born 1998), Ukrainian-Israeli tennis player
 Olga García Mancheño, organic chemistry professor
 Olga Gerovasili (born 1961), Greek politician
 Olga Golodets (born 1962), Russian economist and politician
 Olga Govortsova (born 1988), Belarusian tennis player
 Olga Grau (born 1945), Chilean writer, professor, philosopher
 Olga di Grésy (1900–1994), Italian fashion designer
 Olga Grushin (born 1971), Russian-American novelist
 Olga Guillot (1922–2010), Cuban singer
 Olga Havlová (1933–1996), Czechoslovak, Václav Havel's first wife
 Olga Herlin (1875–1965), Swedish, first female engraver
 Olga Hrycak (born 1947), Canadian former basketball player and coach
 Olga Ilyin, Russian-born American poet and novelist
 Olya Ivanisevic (born 1988), Serbian fashion model
 Olga Kaniskina (born 1985), Russian racewalker
 Olga Kay (born 1982), Russian-American comedian and actress
 Olga Kazi (born 1941), Hungarian middle distance runner
 Olga Kern (born 1975), Russian pianist
 Olga Knorring (1887–1978), Russian botanist
 Olga Koch (born 1992), Russian born British stand-up comedian
 Olga Korbut (born 1955), Belarusian gymnast
 Olga Kurban (born 1987), Russian heptathlete
 Olga Kurkulina (born 1971), Israeli high jumper
 Olga Kurylenko (born 1979), Ukrainian model and actress
 Olga Korhoven Lakela (1890–1980), Finnish-American botanist and educator
 Olga Lehmann (born 1912), Chilean born painter and designer
 Olga Lengyel (1908–2001), Hungarian Holocaust survivor and author
 Olga Lenskiy (born 1992), Israeli sprinter
 Olga Malinkiewicz (born 1982), Polish physicist and inventor
 Olga Markova (athlete) (born 1968), Russian long-distance runner
 Olga Markova (figure skater) (born 1974), Russian figure skater
 Olga Mata, Venezuelan woman detained for publishing a humorous TikTok video
 Olga Merediz (born 1956), American Broadway, TV, and film actress
 Olga Mikhaylova (born 1986), Russian race walker
 Olga Morozova (born 1949), USSR (now Russian) former tennis player
 Olga Oinola (1865–1949), Finnish suffragette and President of the Finnish Women Association
 Olga Ozarovskaya (1874–1933), Russian folklorist, performer, writer
 Olga Panfyorova (born 1977), Russian race walker
 Olga Pendleton, American statistician
 Olga Peredery (born 1994), Ukrainian handball player
 Olga Petrova (1884–1977), British-American actress, screenwriter and playwright
 Olga Pikhienko (born 1980), Russian circus performer
 Olga Polyuk (born 1987), Ukrainian freestyle skier
 Olga Puchkova (born 1987), Russian tennis player
 Olga Radke, Lutheran church worker, musician, helped run the Hermannsburg Choir, Australia, in the 1960s
 Olga Raonić (born 1986), Serbian volleyball player
 Olga Rutterschmidt (born 1933), American murderer of two homeless men for life insurance money
 Olga Sandberg (born 1844), Swedish ballerina
 Olga Savchuk (born 1987), Ukrainian tennis player
 Olga Sehnalová (born 1968), Czech politician
 Olga Seryabkina (born 1985), Russian singer
 Olga Silvestre (born 1964), Portuguese politician
 Olga Sosnovska (born 1972), Polish-British actress
 Olga Souza (born 1968), Brazilian singer
 Olga Šplíchalová (born 1975), Czech freestyle swimmer
 Olga Syahputra (1983–2015), Indonesian comedy artist
 Olga Tañón (born 1967), Puerto Rican singer
 Olga Tass (1929–2020), Hungarian gymnast
 Olga Terho (1910–2003), Finnish politician
 Olga Tokarczuk (born 1962), Polish writer, activist, and public intellectual
 Olga Turchak (born 1967), Kazakh high jumper
 Olga Ulyanova (1922–2011), Russian scientist and niece of Vladimir Lenin
 Olga Vigil (born 1970), Cuban basketball player
 Olga Vymetálková (born 1976), Czech tennis player
 Olga Winterberg (1922–2010), Israeli Olympian in the discus throw
 Olga Zaitseva (born 1978), Russian bi-athlete
 Olga Zhitova (born 1983), Russian volleyball player
 Olga Zrihen (born 1953), Moroccan-Belgian politician

Fictional characters 
 Olga Marie Animusphere in the Japanese mobile game Fate/Grand Order
Olga da Polga, a fictional Guinea pig the subject of a book series by Michael Bond
 Olga Fitzgerald in series 10 of the British television programme Waterloo Road, portrayed by Pooky Quesnel
Olga Gurlukovich in Metal Gear Solid 2: Sons of Liberty
 Olga Orly in Apollo Justice: Ace Attorney
 Olga Pataki in the American animated television series Hey Arnold
Olga Sergeyevna Prozorova in the Russian play Three Sisters by Anton Chekhov
 Olga in Neighbours From Hell 2: On Vacation, who is Mr Rottweiler's love interest
 Olga, a.k.a. Olgariki, in the Russian animated children's television series GoGoRiki
 Olga "meat" Romanova is a general of "The Volk" in the Crackdown video game series

See also 
 Olga (disambiguation)

External links 
 Popularity of the name in the United States
 Diminutives of Olga

Slavic feminine given names
Russian feminine given names
Ukrainian feminine given names
Latvian feminine given names
Lithuanian feminine given names
Serbian feminine given names
Slovene feminine given names
Croatian feminine given names
Bulgarian feminine given names
Polish feminine given names
Czech feminine given names
Slovak feminine given names
Romanian feminine given names
Italian feminine given names
Spanish feminine given names
Portuguese feminine given names
Greek feminine given names
German feminine given names
Hungarian feminine given names
Albanian feminine given names
Finnish feminine given names

el:Όλγα (όνομα)